The Women's under-23 time trial at the 2014 European Road Championships took place on 18 July. The Championships were hosted by the Swiss municipality of Nyon. The course was 26.9 km long, and 28 cyclists competed in the time trial.

Top 10 final classification

References

See also

 2014 European Road Championships – Women's under-23 road race

European Road Championships – Women's U23 time trial
2014 European Road Championships
2014 in women's road cycling